The T-Mobile Tap is a mobile phone manufactured by Huawei, Inc. and marketed under the T-Mobile brand and service. It is also known as the Huawei U7519. It was released in November 2009, and was available in many European and Asian markets.

Features 
The Tap features a 2.8-inch resistive touchscreen. It also features a 2.0 megapixel camera, Bluetooth connectivity, built-in GPS, a music player, and access to T-Mobile's MyFaves. While it lacks a 3.5 mm headset jack, the device instead comes with an in-ear headset that connects through the Tap's USB port. The phone is also bundled with a USB cable to manage files on a personal computer, Huawei's PC Suite software to manage the files, and a T-Mobile full size SIM card. A spring-loading microSD slot is located under the phone's battery cover.

Physical buttons are the power button, a lock button and camera launcher on the side of the phone, a call start button, a navigation pad and 'wheel', and a call end button. The physical specifications of this phone are comparable with that of the HTC Touch.

The phone currently comes in the colors midnight blue and berry (metallic pink).

Notes
It cannot be used without a SIM card.

External links
Tap profile at t-mobile.com
Huawei

Deutsche Telekom
Huawei mobile phones